Geckoella is a disputed genus of Gekkonidae endemic to India and Sri Lanka.

Classification of genus Geckoella
The phylogenetic relationships within the genus Geckoella has not been resolved to date. They have all been placed under the genus Cyrtodactylus until a more definitive classification can be worked out.

Seven species have been recorded.

The five species found in India, listed alphabetically, are :
Geckoella albofasciatus (Boulenger, 1885)– Boulenger's Indian gecko 
Geckoella collegalensis (Beddome, 1870) – Kollegal ground gecko
Geckoella deccanensis (Günther, 1864)
Geckoella jeyporensis (Beddome, 1877) – Patinghe Indian gecko
Geckoella nebulosus (Beddome, 1870)

Two species found in Sri Lanka, listed alphabetically, are :
Geckoella triedrus (Günther, 1864) - Sri Lanka Gecko
Geckoella yakhuna (Deraniyagala, 1945) - Northern Sri Lanka Gecko, 
occur in the arid and moist zones of Sri Lanka respectively.

References

Works cited
 
 

Geckos
Taxa named by John Edward Gray